Lake Chala, also known as  Lake Challa, is a crater lake that straddles the border between Kenya and Tanzania. The lake formed approximately 250,000 years ago.

The lake surface has an average annual evaporation of near . It takes about 3 months for groundwater to reach the lake.

Ecology

The only native fish in this lake is the Lake Chala tilapia (Oreochromis hunteri), which is found nowhere else in the world. It is considered critically endangered by the IUCN, and now greatly outnumbered by other tilapia species that have been introduced to Lake Chala.

An 18 year old British woman was killed in 2002 by a relatively small Nile crocodile while swimming at night in the lake. A few days later, the Kenya Police Service said that the lake was "infested" with crocodiles, while the Kenya Wildlife Service said, "Crocodiles are found in Lake Chala and it is not regarded as safe to swim at all."

See also

List of lakes of Kenya
List of lakes of Tanzania
Rombo District
Chaga people

References

Lakes of Kenya
Lakes of Tanzania
Geography of Kilimanjaro Region